Isabella Plantation is a woodland garden in Richmond Park in south west London. It is managed by The Royal Parks.

Originally located in a boggy part of Richmond Park, it was labelled on a 1771 map as Isabell Slade.

The Isabella Plantation was established in the early 19th century when Lord Sidmouth, who was Deputy Ranger of Richmond  Park and a former Prime Minister of the United Kingdom, fenced it as an area of woodland to keep the park's deer out. After World War II it was transformed into a woodland garden. It is now organically run, resulting in a rich flora and fauna. Opened to the public in 1953, it is now a major visitor attraction in its own right.

In October 2012 it was reported that about 40 per cent of the Isabella Plantation is covered with Rhododendron ponticum, a non-native and invasive variety of rhododendron introduced by the Victorians, and that this would be removed over the next five years.

In 2014, improvements were made to the Plantation to incorporate new direction signs, wheelchair-accessible pathways and toilets and a new shelter and gazebo through a project funded by the Heritage Lottery Fund. The works also incorporated de-silting of all three ponds (Peg's Pond, Thomson's Pond and Still Pond) in the Plantation and establishing new waterfalls in the streams, funded by The Royal Parks with contributions from the Friends of Richmond Park.

References

External links
The Royal Parks: Isabella Plantation 
VisitRichmond: Isabella Plantation
Panoramic Earth: Isabella Plantation

Parks and open spaces in the London Borough of Richmond upon Thames
Richmond Park
Woodland gardens